The Tour Sueño Electro I was the third musical tour of electropop group Belanova, announcing dates through their Twitter and its official website counted with great dates in the US and many videos that the band shared their personal YouTube account, this tour was in support of their fourth record label production Sueño Electro I and  visited several state of Mexico & USA

Set list 

"Rosa Pastel"
"Cada Que..."
"Solo Para Mi"
"Bye Bye]"
"Escena Final"
"Toma Mi Mano"
"Paso El Tiempo"
"Y Mi Corazón"
"Eres Tú"
"No Me Voy a Morir"
"Niño"
"Tus Ojos"
"Me Pregunto"
"Tic - Toc"
"Por ti"
"Baila Mi Corazón"
"Nada De Más"
"1,2,3,GO!"

Shows

References 

2010 concert tours